White Van Stories is a documentary by Indian filmmaker Leena Manimekalai for Channel 4 on the long history of enforced disappearances in Sri Lanka. It interviews people who have lost their families and how they cope with the trauma and tragedy and how they move all along with their life. It also covers about their protest to know about what happened to their relatives.

Leena filmed the historical protests of the families of the disappeared in Jaffna and Colombo who were asking for justice, truth and reparation, declaring "No Peace" until their loved ones return. And She followed seven women who shared their stories across the east, south and north provinces. Access was incredibly challenging. North of Sri Lanka is heavily militarized and this is a story that had been largely impenetrable to the media as enforced disappearances also include journalists who are considered even slightly critical of state and its policies. Ultimately the film had to be made under severe vigilance and intimidation by the Lankan military. On one occasion Leena was asked to leave the country and on another detained for hours of questioning at a check post where they confiscated her tapes and denied her permission to film. The premiere of White Van Stories was broadcast on Channel 4.

References

External links 

Documentary films alleging war crimes
Documentary films about the Sri Lankan Civil War
Indian documentary films
Films directed by Leena Manimekalai